Eupithecia curvifascia is a moth in the  family Geometridae. It is found on Jamaica.

References

Moths described in 1904
curvifascia
Moths of the Caribbean